Dennis Hughes (born 3 July 1941) is a former Welsh rugby union international player. Hughes was born at Argoed, Caerphilly. He played as a flanker for Newbridge RFC, and won six caps for Wales during the period 1967-1970. He later worked as a sales manager for Biomet at Bridgend.

Dennis was selected for three matches in Wales' 1970 Five Nations campaign, playing against Scotland, England and Ireland. During the match at Twickenham, he played a part in Chico Hopkins' memorable appearance. When Gareth Edwards and Dennis both missed a tackle on Nigel Starmer-Smith, the two Wales players collided, resulting in an injury to Edwards who was unable to continue. This gave replacement Chico his one and only cap for his country. He took the field twenty minutes from full time and inspired the team to an impressive comeback. England had gained the upper hand and were winning 13 points to 6 until Chico made a try for JPR and followed up with a try of his own from the back of a lineout. Wales still needed a successful conversion to take a one point lead. JPR Williams duly obliged and Barry John added a drop goal well into a long injury time.

References

1941 births
Welsh rugby union players
Rugby union flankers
Wales international rugby union players
Living people
Barbarian F.C. players
Newbridge RFC players
Monmouthshire County RFC players
Rugby union players from Caerphilly
Alumni of Aberystwyth University